Corrigan Creek is a stream in the municipality of Greenstone, Thunder Bay District in northwestern Ontario, Canada. It is in the Great Lakes Basin, is a left tributary of the Namewaminikan River, and lies in the geographic township of Sandra.

The river flows northwest  from Corrigan Lake to its mouth at the Namewaminikan River. The Namewaminikan River flows via Lake Nipigon and the Nipigon River to Lake Superior.

References

Sources

Rivers of Thunder Bay District